Auerodendron jamaicense is a species of plant in the family Rhamnaceae. It is endemic to Jamaica.

References

Flora of Jamaica
jamaicense
Vulnerable plants
Endemic flora of Jamaica
Taxonomy articles created by Polbot